Najmul Hasan Zahed was a Bangladesh Awami League politician and the former Member of Parliament of Habiganj-2.

Birth and family life
Zahed was born and raised in a Bengali Muslim Zamindar family in the village of Kamalkhani in Habiganj's Baniachong Upazila. His father, Siddiq Hasan, belonged to the Hasan family. His mother was Syeda Sufya Khatun. His older brother is Fazle Hasan Abed, the founder of BRAC, the world's largest non-governmental organisation. He was the director of the Bangladesh National Tea Company (NTC).

Career
Zahed was elected to parliament from Habiganj-2 as a Bangladesh Awami League candidate in 2001.

Death and legacy
Zahed died of old age at the Apollo Hospital Dhaka on 16 August 2010 at 80 years of age. He was buried in the Hasan family graveyard in Baniachong. The Najmul Hasan Zahed Academy was named after him.

References

Awami League politicians
Living people
8th Jatiya Sangsad members
People from Baniachong Upazila
1930 births